James William Speck (April 14, 1896 – March 20, 1969) was a Canadian professional ice hockey player. He played with the Toronto Blueshirts and the Toronto 228th Battalion of the National Hockey Association, and the Calgary Tigers of the Western Canada Hockey League.

References

1896 births
1969 deaths
Calgary Tigers players
Canadian ice hockey centres
Ice hockey people from Ontario
Sportspeople from London, Ontario
Toronto 228th Battalion players
Toronto Blueshirts players